HeartShare Human Services of New York, originally founded in 1914 as the Catholic Guardian Society of the Archdiocese of New York (sometimes referred to as the Catholic Guardian Society of Brooklyn and Queens) is a nonprofit human-services organization in New York City. , it was the third-largest children's services provider in the city.

History
The Catholic Guardian Society of the Archdiocese of New York was established in July 1914 to assist teens transitioning from orphanages and institutions to life on their own, when neither the law nor society provided any protections. The 1922 Catholic Encyclopedia described the organization as:

In 1921, reportedly, "over 12,000 visits were made by the Society's agents, nearly 4,000 children visited the Society's offices, and over 2,000 boys and girls attended the Society's annual reunion". At that time, the president of the society was Archbishop Patrick Joseph Hayes. In 1985, former social worker Bill Guarinello was named CEO of the Catholic Guardian Society, and was additionally named president of the organization in 1993; around the time, it became HeartShare Human Services of New York.

The organization has partnered with numerous celebrities, including Lauren Hutton, Linda Dano (for whom an annual award bestowed by the organization is named), Abigail Hawk, and Danny Aiello (who partnered with the group in the mid-1990s "to create the Frances Aiello Day Habilitation Program, a treatment center in Brooklyn".

HeartShare has been a party to several National Labor Relations Board cases involving alleged misconduct by the organization with respect to efforts by employees to form a labor union. In a case filed in 1995, and finally decided by the United States Court of Appeals for the Second Circuit in 1997, HeartShare was found liable for refusing to negotiate with a union formed at the Francis Aiello Day Treatment Center. The court also found that the individual center was an appropriate bargaining unit because its immediate supervision was separate from other centers, and employees had a lack of contact and interchange with employees of other centers.

Programs and dervices

Developmental disabilities services

ArtShare for HeartShare is available to children and adults with intellectual and developmental disabilities, who create multimedia works, as well as jewelry making and design.

HeartShare St. Vincent's Services

HeartShare St. Vincent’s Services was established in 2014. The American Dream Program offers college tuition help, room, board, and other benefits, such as counseling and support, to young people in foster care. In January 2019, the program received a $20,000 donation from the Northfield Bank Foundation.

References

Non-profit organizations based in New York City
1914 establishments in New York City
Roman Catholic Archdiocese of New York